Kaarel Parts (5 June 1873 – 5 December 1940) was an Estonian lawyer, judge and politician. He was a member of Estonian Constituent Assembly.

From 1919 to 1940 he was Chief Justice of Estonia.

References

1873 births
1940 deaths
People from Otepää Parish
People from Kreis Dorpat
Russian Constitutional Democratic Party members
Estonian People's Party politicians
Members of the 2nd State Duma of the Russian Empire
Members of the Estonian Provincial Assembly
Members of the Estonian Constituent Assembly
20th-century Estonian judges
University of Tartu alumni
Recipients of the Military Order of the Cross of the Eagle, Class I
Recipients of the Order of the White Star, 1st Class